Jerzy Topolski (20 September 1928 – 21 December 1998) was a Polish historian specializing in economic history, history of material culture, the early modern period, and theory and methodology of history. Member of Polish Academy of Sciences, professor of Adam Mickiewicz University in Poznań, he wrote over 1.100 articles and about 30 books.

Publications 
 Rozwój latyfundium arcybiskupstwa gnieźnieńskiego od XV do XVIII w., 1955
 Położenie i walka klasowa chłopów w XVIII w. w dobrach arcybiskupstwa gnieźnieńskiego, 1956
 O wyjaśnianiu przyczynowym historii, 1957
 Gospodarstwa wiejskie w dobrach arcybiskupa gnieźnieńskiego od XVI do XVIII w., 1958
 Historia Polski od czasów najdawniejszych do 1990, 1992

Gallery 

1928 births
1998 deaths
20th-century Polish historians
Polish male non-fiction writers